"Feed This Fire" is a song written by Hugh Prestwood, and first recorded by American country music group Highway 101 on their 1988 album 101². The group did not release it as a single. The song was then recorded by Canadian country music artist Anne Murray in early 1990 for a summer release to radio. Murray's version was released in August 1990 as the first single from her album You Will. The song reached number six on the Canadian RPM Country Tracks chart in November 1990. In the U.S., the song peaked at number five on the Billboard Hot Country Singles chart for the week ending Saturday, November 10, 1990. It was Murray's last Billboard top ten country single in the United States.

Chart performance

Year-end charts

References

1988 songs
1990 singles
Songs written by Hugh Prestwood
Anne Murray songs
Highway 101 songs
Capitol Records Nashville singles
Song recordings produced by Jerry Crutchfield